These are tables of congressional delegations from Vermont to the United States Senate and United States House of Representatives.

Until 2022, Vermont was the only state in the United States that had never sent a woman to Congress when Becca Balint became its only U.S. House member. Despite its status as a heavily Democratic-majority state, it has only sent two Democratic United States senators to Congress in its entire history. Bernie Sanders and Peter Welch are the current senators from the state. 

The current dean of the Vermont congressional delegation is Senator Bernie Sanders (I), having served in Congress since 1991.

United States Senate

U.S. House of Representatives 
Current representative

1791–1813: Districts

1813–1823: Six seats 
Vermont used at-large seats, but restored the districts in 1821.

1823–1843: Five seats 
Starting after the 1820 United States census, Vermont had five seats. Initially it used at-large seats, but starting in 1825 those seats were districted. All five representatives supported the Adams-Clay faction in the 1824 United States presidential election.

1843–1853: Four seats 
Starting after the 1840 United States census, Vermont had four seats.

1853–1883: Three seats 
Starting after the 1850 United States census, Vermont had three seats.

1883–1933: Two seats 
Starting after the 1880 United States census, Vermont had two seats.

1933–present: At-large
Since 1933, Vermont has had one at-large seat.

References

 Congressional Biographical Directory of the United States 1774–present
 Information from the Clerk of the U.S. House of Representatives

Key

See also

List of United States congressional districts
Vermont's congressional districts 
Political party strength in Vermont

Politics of Vermont
 
Vermont
 
Congressional delegations